Corwith is a city in Hancock County, Iowa, United States. The population was 266 at the time of the 2020 census.

History
Corwith got its start in the year 1880, following construction of the Minneapolis & St. Louis Railroad through that territory. It burned down in the 1800s. The first buildings to be built were a hotel and the train depot.

Geography
Corwith is located at  (42.993334, -93.955931) on the Boone River.

Demographics

2010 census
As of the census of 2010, there were 309 people, 141 households, and 78 families living in the city. The racial makeup of the city was 97.7% White, 0.3% Asian, 1.3% from other races, and 0.6% from two or more races. Hispanic or Latino of any race were 4.2% of the population.

There were 141 households, of which 22.0% had children under the age of 18 living with them, 46.1% were married couples living together, 7.1% had a female householder with no husband present, 2.1% had a male householder with no wife present, and 44.7% were non-families. 35.5% of all households were made up of individuals, and 19.9% had someone living alone who was 65 years of age or older. The average household size was 2.19 and the average family size was 2.85.

The median age in the city was 46.3 years. 20.1% of residents were under the age of 18; 6.8% were between the ages of 18 and 24; 20% were from 25 to 44; 31.4% were from 45 to 64; and 21.7% were 65 years of age or older. The gender makeup of the city was 51.8% male and 48.2% female.

2000 census
As of the census of 2000, there were 350 people, 150 households, and 94 families living in the city. The racial makeup of the city was 96.57% White, 0.29% Native American, 3.14% from other races. Hispanic or Latino of any race were 6.57% of the population.

There were 150 households, out of which 28.7% had children under the age of 18 living with them, 51.3% were married couples living together, 7.3% had a female householder with no husband present, and 37.3% were non-families. 34.0% of all households were made up of individuals, and 19.3% had someone living alone who was 65 years of age or older. The average household size was 2.33 and the average family size was 2.97.

In the city, the population was spread out, with 25.7% under the age of 18, 5.1% from 18 to 24, 24.6% from 25 to 44, 22.6% from 45 to 64, and 22.0% who were 65 years of age or older. The median age was 40 years. For every 100 females, there were 94.4 males. For every 100 females age 18 and over, there were 88.4 males.

The median income for a household in the city was $27,222, and the median income for a family was $38,333. Males had a median income of $32,031 versus $16,528 for females. The per capita income for the city was $13,054. About 9.8% of families and 11.4% of the population were below the poverty line, including 10.1% of those under age 18 and 8.2% of those age 65 or over.

Education
Lu Verne Community School District serves the community. Since 2015, Lu Verne sends its secondary students to the Algona Community School District, which operates Algona Middle School and Algona High School.

Corwith–Wesley Community School District served the community until it dissolved on July 1, 2015. That district operated Corwith–Wesley–Lu Verne High School. The demolition of the former Corwith school was anticipated for 2016.

Notable people
 E. Thurman Gaskill, Assistant Majority Leader in the Iowa Senate
 Sue Mullins, Iowa farmer and state legislator

References

External links
 Corwith Wesley LuVerne Times

Cities in Iowa
Cities in Hancock County, Iowa
1880 establishments in Iowa
Populated places established in 1880